Allen Blaine Worley of Roanoke, Virginia, Captain (USN), Rear Admiral (USMS), was the tenth Superintendent of the United States Merchant Marine Academy (USMMA) at Kings Point, New York. Retired career U.S. Navy and a 1974 graduate of the United States Naval Academy at Annapolis, Maryland, Worley was  Superintendent of the Texas Maritime Academy, one of the United States' six state maritime academies prior to his being appointed Superintendent of the United States Merchant Marine Academy in 2008. In addition to his Naval Academy BS degree in physics, Webster University awarded him a MA degree in business administration and personnel management, and the United States Naval War College awarded him a MA degree in national security and strategic studies. Admiral Worley resigned from his position as Superintendent of the USMMA in 2009, effective January 4, 2010, serving as the Academy’s Superintendent for just over a year.

References

Year of birth missing (living people)
Living people
People from Roanoke, Virginia
United States Naval Academy alumni
United States Naval Aviators
Military personnel from Virginia
Webster University alumni
Naval War College alumni
United States Navy captains
United States Merchant Marine Academy superintendents